Matsui Shikiso Chemical Co., Ltd was founded in 1911 by Kenji Matsui. Matsui Shikiso Chemical started offering a wide variety of products, mainly inks and pigments targeted principally to the textile screen printing industry.  Focusing as being an exclusive water base ink producer in the textile industry, Matsui's continued success led to establishing a subsidiary in Los Angeles, California to better service their growing international clientele. In 1987, Matsui International developed the first thermochromic paints, thermochromic inks, and thermochromic plastics, broadcast on Japan's national public channel, NHK (Nippon Hosoku Kaisha), introducing thermochromism to the world. In 1989 the subsidiary Matsui International Co., Inc., was founded, and is run by Masahiko Matsui, the grandson of Kenji Matsui. Soon after the establishment, Matsui entered the heat transfer business, under the trademark, Unimark USA.
Matsui Shikiso manufactured the color dyes for Hypercolor shirts.

References

External links
 Matsui Shikiso Chemical Co., Ltd
 Matsui International Co., Ltd.
 Unimark USA

Chemical companies of Japan